David Conklin (born September 22, 1955) is an American former ice sled hockey player. He won medals with Team USA at the 2002 Winter Paralympics and 2006 Winter Paralympics. He also competed in the 1998 Winter Paralympics.

References

Living people
1955 births
People from Edgerton, Wisconsin
Sportspeople from Wisconsin
Paralympic sledge hockey players of the United States
American sledge hockey players
Paralympic gold medalists for the United States
Medalists at the 2002 Winter Paralympics
Medalists at the 2006 Winter Paralympics
Paralympic medalists in sledge hockey
Ice sledge hockey players at the 2002 Winter Paralympics
Ice sledge hockey players at the 2006 Winter Paralympics